More Missing Pieces is the re-release of Autograph's 1997 album Missing Pieces with seven additional tracks.

Track listing

References

2003 albums
Autograph (American band) albums